Grand Canyon High School is a public high school located near the Grand Canyon in Grand Canyon Village, Arizona. It is the only high school in the Grand Canyon Unified School District.

References

Schools in Coconino County, Arizona
Educational institutions in the United States with year of establishment missing
Public high schools in Arizona